Vincenzo "Enzo" Montefusco (born 26 April 1945 in Naples) is an Italian former football player and manager, who played as a midfielder. He is most noted for his association with his hometown side Napoli, where he played for over a decade as a player. He also had several managerial spells in Serie B and Serie C, with teams such as Cosenza and Pisa, before joining Napoli's coaching staff in the role of the team's youth coach. During the late 1990s he also served three times as the club's caretaker manager, replacing Luigi Simoni, Giovanni Galeone and Renzo Ulivieri respectively. He was ultimately sacked by Napoli following the club's promotion to Serie A at the end of the 1999–2000 season. In 2008, he became director of football of Real Marcianise in Lega Pro.

References

Living people
Italian footballers
Association football midfielders
Serie A players
Serie B players
S.S.C. Napoli players
Calcio Foggia 1920 players
L.R. Vicenza players
Taranto F.C. 1927 players
S.S.C. Napoli managers
Pisa S.C. managers
Cosenza Calcio managers
S.S. Juve Stabia managers
1945 births
Italian football managers